Denise Hallion (born 15 May 1966) is a South African dressage rider. She competed at the 2014 World Equestrian Games in Normandy where she finished 20th with the South African team in the team competition and 93rd in the individual dressage competition.

References

Living people
1966 births
South African female equestrians
South African dressage riders
Place of birth missing (living people)